KFTA-TV (channel 24) is a television station licensed to Fort Smith, Arkansas, United States, serving as the Fox affiliate for the Arkansas River Valley and Northwest Arkansas. It is owned by Nexstar Media Group alongside Rogers-licensed NBC affiliate KNWA-TV (channel 51) and Eureka Springs–licensed MyNetworkTV affiliate KXNW (channel 34). The stations share studios at the Underwood Building on Dickson Street in downtown Fayetteville, with a satellite studio in Rogers and a news bureau and sales office on Kelley Highway in Fort Smith (which served as KFTA-TV's original studio facilities). KFTA-TV's transmitter is located in unincorporated northeastern Crawford County (south of Artist Point).

History

As an NBC affiliate
The station debuted on November 12, 1978 as KLMN, the area's third television station. It took the CBS affiliation from KFPW-TV and its Fayetteville satellite KTVP (channel 40 and 29, now KHBS/KHOG). Among its original investors were Walmart heirs Jim and Rob Walton. In 1980, it swapped affiliations with KFSM-TV (channel 5) and became the area's NBC affiliate, due to CBS searching for stronger affiliates in the Fort Smith market. Two years later, on September 22, 1982, the station changed its calls to KPOM-TV ("People on the Move").

Channel 24 struggled during its early years. Besides being the area's newest station, it was hampered by the fact it was a UHF station in a market that is very mountainous. Despite its 2.5 million watt effective radiated power, it only provided a Grade B signal to Fayetteville and could not be seen at all in Rogers and points north. For most of this station's first ten years on the air, viewers in the northern part of the area had to rely on cable to watch the station. Much of the far northern part of the market got a better signal from KSNF in Joplin, Missouri (which, incidentally, switched from CBS to NBC in 1982).

In 1986, the station was sold to Oklahoma City-based Griffin Communications, owners of longtime CBS affiliate KWTV in Oklahoma City, who immediately set about solving the reception problem. It signed-on full-time satellite KFAA-TV in 1989 to provide a better signal in Fayetteville and the northern part of the market. In 2004, Griffin Television sold KPOM/KFAA to Nexstar, the stations changed their calls to KFTA-TV and KNWA-TV respectively on August 13, 2004 and the latter became the main station. The two stations' operations were merged in a new studio in the historic Campbell-Bell Building in downtown Fayetteville, with KFTA's original studio remaining as the stations' Arkansas River Valley bureau.

As a Fox affiliate
On April 19, 2006, Nexstar Broadcasting Group announced it would sell KFTA-TV to Brecksville, Ohio-based Mission Broadcasting – a group which maintained joint sales and shared services agreements with Nexstar-operated outlets (as well as those maintained by Quorum Broadcasting prior to Nexstar's 2003 purchase of that group) to operate many of Mission's stations in markets that did not have enough television stations to allow a legal duopoly between two commercial broadcast outlets – for $5.6 million. Under the terms of the agreement, KFTA would continue to be operated by Nexstar under a local marketing agreement with KNWA. Mission would also relaunch KFTA as a separate station that would take over the market's Fox affiliation; NBC programming would be moved concurrently to a digital subchannel in the form of a KNWA simulcast, in order to continue relaying the network's programming over-the-air throughout the entire market.

Equity Broadcasting, then-owner of Poteau, Oklahoma-licensed Class A station KPBI-CA (channel 46, now defunct), challenged the sale of KFTA with the Federal Communications Commission (FCC), on grounds that the Fox affiliation switch would violate an existing contract that Equity had with the network. Despite the challenge continuing onward at the time, KFTA became a Fox affiliate on August 28. (KPBI subsequently become a charter affiliate of MyNetworkTV when the Fox-owned network launched on September 5.) However, with some exceptions, KFTA continued to simulcast the KNWA schedule daily from 7:00 a.m. to 5:00 p.m. and from 10:30 p.m. to 5:00 a.m. until January 2008, when the two stations began maintaining separate programming schedules full-time. , Nexstar remains the official owner of KFTA, according to FCC records, due to Nexstar's supplemental application of a clarification of waiver (which the FCC has not yet acted on).

On December 3, 2018, Nexstar announced it would acquire Chicago-based Tribune Media—which has owned CBS affiliate KFSM-TV and MyNetworkTV affiliate KXNW (channel 34) since December 2013—in an all-cash deal valued at $6.4 billion, including the assumption of Tribune-held outstanding debt. Because KNWA and KFSM both rank among the four highest-rated stations in the Fort Smith–Fayetteville market in total day viewership, and broadcasters are not currently allowed to legally own more than two full-power television stations in a single market, Nexstar may be required to sell either KNWA/KFTA or KFSM/KXNW to another broadcasting company in order to comply with FCC ownership rules and alleviate potential antitrust issues preceding approval of the acquisition. On March 20, 2019, it was announced that Nexstar would keep the KNWA/KFTA duopoly (through an existing satellite station waiver that predated KFTA's conversion into a separately programmed Fox affiliate in 2006) and sell KFSM to McLean, Virginia-based Tegna Inc., as part of the company's sale of nineteen Nexstar- and Tribune-operated stations to Tegna and the E. W. Scripps Company in separate deals worth $1.32 billion. KXNW was not named in the sale, which would effectively result in the formation of a de facto triopoly between KFTA and KNWA. The deal—which would make Nexstar the largest television station operator by total number of stations upon its expected closure late in the third quarter of 2019, pending regulatory approval by the FCC and the U.S. Department of Justice's Antitrust Division—would make the KNWA/KFTA duopoly sister stations to Tribune's Oklahoma City duopoly of NBC affiliate KFOR-TV and independent station KAUT-TV (which, in turn, would result in Nexstar owning stations in every market serving portions of the state of Oklahoma, except for the Tulsa and Ada–Sherman markets). The sale was approved by the FCC on September 16 and was completed on September 19, 2019.

Subchannel history

KFTA-DT2

As the latter's transmitter southeast of Garfield cannot cover the southern portions of the market (including Fort Smith proper), KFTA carries a simulcast of NBC-affiliated sister station KNWA-TV on channel 24.2 – transmitting in 1080i high definition – alongside its main signal, in order to relay channel 51's programming throughout the entire Fort Smith–Fayetteville market.

KFTA-DT3
KFTA-DT3 is the Ion Mystery-affiliated third digital subchannel of KFTA-TV, broadcasting in standard definition on channel 24.3.

On June 15, 2016, Nexstar Broadcasting Group announced that it had entered into an agreement with Katz Broadcasting to affiliate 81 stations owned and/or operated by the group — including KFTA-TV and KNWA-TV — with one or more of Katz's four digital multicast networks, Escape (later Court TV Mystery, now Ion Mystery), Laff, Grit and Bounce TV (the latter of which is owned by Bounce Media LLC, whose COO Jonathan Katz serves as president/CEO of Katz Broadcasting). As part of the agreement, KFTA-TV first launched a digital subchannel on virtual channel 24.3 on September 1 of that year to serve as an affiliate of Escape.

KFTA-DT4
KFTA-DT4 is the Bounce TV-affiliated fourth digital subchannel of KFTA-TV, broadcasting in standard definition on channel 24.4. As part of the agreement reached between Nexstar Broadcasting Group and Katz Broadcasting in June 2016, on September 1 of that year, KFTA launched a digital subchannel on virtual channel 24.4 to serve as an affiliate of Bounce TV. (The Laff and Grit affiliation rights for the Fort Smith–Fayetteville market were given to sister station KNWA, which launched subchannels over virtual channels 51.3 and 51.4 to carry those networks on that same date.)

KFTA-DT5

As the latter's transmitter southeast of Garfield cannot cover the southern portions of the market (including Fort Smith proper), KFTA carries a simulcast of MyNetworkTV-affiliated sister station KXNW on its fifth subchannel – transmitting in 720p high definition – alongside its main signal, in order to relay channel 34's programming throughout the entire Fort Smith–Fayetteville market. Instead of channel 24.5, KFTA-DT5 maps to channel 34.1.

Programming
KFTA-TV currently carries the entire Fox network schedule (consisting of prime time, Saturday late night, and sports programming, as well as some special reports produced by Fox News). Syndicated programs broadcast on KFTA include The Doctors, Divorce Court, Two and a Half Men, The Real, Mike & Molly, Last Man Standing and The Big Bang Theory.

To comply with programming guidelines imposed by the Children's Television Act, the station also carries a half-hour of educational children's programming on Monday through Saturday mornings at 8:00 a.m., consisting solely of programs from the Steve Rotfeld Productions-distributed Xploration Station, a live-action E/I block which normally airs on most Fox stations and select other minor network affiliates on weekend mornings.

Newscasts
, KNWA-TV produces 13½ hours of locally produced newscasts each week for KFTA-TV (with 3½ hours each weekday and one hour each on Saturdays and Sundays). As the duopoly partner of KNWA, the station may also simulcast long-form severe weather coverage from the NBC affiliate in the event that a tornado warning is issued for any county in its viewing area within northwest Arkansas and east-central Oklahoma.

News programming history
Channel 24 aired local news from its first day on the air in 1978. However, this newscast was never able to gain much traction in the market, even with NBC's prime time lineup as a lead-in. The newscast was canceled in 1992, and for the next seven years KPOM/KFAA was one of the few Big Three affiliates with no newscasts at all.

KPOM and KFAA relaunched a local newscast in 1999, under the brand Arkansas' NBC News; Griffin hired top local talent to anchor the newscasts including Don Elkins, Donna Bragg, Steve Gibbs, Mike Nail, and Rhonda Justice, the latter four of whom formerly worked at rival ABC-affiliated station KHBS/KHOG.

KFTA dramatically scaled back its newscasts upon switching to Fox on August 28, 2006; on that date, KNWA began producing a half-hour prime time newscast at 9:00 p.m. for KFTA, marking the first attempt at a prime time newscast in the Fort Smith–Fayetteville market. Titled Fox 24 News at 9:00, the program initially originated from a secondary news set at KNWA/KFTA's facility in downtown Fayetteville. Originally co-anchored by Dana Sargent (who was reassigned from her role as anchor of KNWA's weekday morning newscast KNWA Today). Competition for the newscast would eventually come in 2012, when CBS affiliate KFSM-TV began producing a half-hour newscast in that timeslot for its MyNetworkTV-affiliated sister KXNW (channel 34) on March 12; KHBS/KHOG subsequently debuted a half-hour prime time newscast at 9:00 p.m. for its CW-affiliated DT2 subchannel on August 20, 2012.

On February 19, 2008, the newscast – which was concurrently retitled the Fox 24 News Edge – was restructured into a more contemporary newscast designed to appeal to younger viewers in the mold of the so-called "Fox attitude". The revamped newscast included a commercial-free block leading off the broadcast, featuring the day's top headlines, a full weather forecast and a sports headline segment during the program's "A" block, along with entertainment, health and lifestyle news segments.

Additional news expansion on KFTA took place in September 2009, when KNWA began producing an hour-long weekday morning newscast at 7:00 a.m. extension for the station, under the title Fox 24 News at 7:00. The newscast would later gain additional morning news competitors in the 7:00 timeslot during the mid-2010s: KFSM launched an extension of its weekday newscast for KXNW in September 2013, which was followed by the launch of a newscast produced by KHBS/KHOG for its DT2 subchannel on September 6, 2016.

On October 24, 2012, coinciding with the move into its new facilities inside the Underwood Building, KNWA began broadcasting its local newscasts in high definition, becoming the market's third and last Big Three network affiliate (after KFSM and KHBS/KHOG) to upgrade its newscasts to the format; KFTA's morning and prime time shows were included in the upgrade. In January 2013, KNWA began production a half-hour newscast at 5:30 p.m. each weeknight for KFTA.

Technical information

Subchannels
The station's digital signal is multiplexed:

Analog-to-digital conversion
KFTA-TV discontinued regular programming on its analog signal (over UHF channel 24) in November 2008, due to the failure of its analog transmitter. The station's digital signal remained on its pre-transition UHF channel 27, using PSIP to display the station's virtual channel as its former UHF analog channel 24.

References

External links
  - KNWA/KFTA/KXNW official website

Fox network affiliates
Ion Mystery affiliates
Bounce TV affiliates
FTA-TV
Television channels and stations established in 1978
1978 establishments in Arkansas
Nexstar Media Group